Vynohradne is an urban-type settlement in the Yalta Municipality of the Autonomous Republic of Crimea, a territory recognized by a majority of countries as part of Ukraine and annexed by Russia as the Republic of Crimea.

It is administratively subordinate to the Livadiya Settlement Council. Its population was 1,151 in the 2001 Ukrainian census. Current population:

References

External links
 http://rada.gov.ua/

Seaside resorts in Russia
Seaside resorts in Ukraine
Urban-type settlements in Crimea
Yalta Municipality